Julius Henry Stickoffer (1845 – September 3, 1925) was a Swiss-born American soldier in the U.S. Army who served as a saddler with the 8th U.S. Cavalry during the Black Hawk War. Stickoffer was cited for gallantry in action against hostile Indians at Cienaga Springs in the Utah Territory on November 11, 1868, for which he received the Medal of Honor two years later. He was the only member of the United States armed forces to win the award during the seven-year conflict.

Biography
Julius Henry Stickoffer was born in Switzerland in 1845, and later emigrated to the United States where he settled in Cincinnati, Ohio. He joined the United States Army from that city in November 1866 and was assigned to Company L of the 8th U.S. Cavalry Regiment as a saddler. Sent to the Utah Territory for frontier duty, he took part in campaigns against the Ute, Paiute and Navajo tribes under led the Ute chieftain Antonga Black Hawk. On November 11, 1868, he and members of the 8th U.S. Cavalry battled the Indians at Cienaga Springs. Stickoffer won distinction during the fight and was awarded the Medal of Honor for "gallantry in action" on March 3, 1870. He was the only one to receive the award during the U.S. Army's entire Indian campaign in Utah. He was discharged in November 1871. He re-enlisted in February 1872, but deserted in September of that year, eventually moved to Yountville, California where he lived until his death on September 3, 1925, at the age of 80. He is one of three MOH winners, along with Sergeants Joseph Leonard and John Moriarity, buried at Veterans Memorial Grove Cemetery.

Medal of Honor citation
Rank and organization: Saddler, Company L, 8th U.S. Cavalry. Place and date: At Cienaga Springs, Utah, 11 November 1868. Entered service at:--. Birth: Switzerland. Date of issue: 3 March 1870. 

Citation:

Gallantry in action.

See also

List of Medal of Honor recipients for the Indian Wars

References

External links
 Retrieved on December 29, 2010
Indian War Campaigns Medal of Honor Recipients for the United States Army at Army Knowledge Online

1845 births
1925 deaths
American military personnel of the Indian Wars
United States Army Medal of Honor recipients
Military personnel from Cincinnati
People from Yountville, California
United States Army soldiers
Foreign-born Medal of Honor recipients
Swiss emigrants to the United States
American Indian Wars recipients of the Medal of Honor